The 2020–21 Winthrop Eagles men's basketball team represented Winthrop University in the 2020–21 NCAA Division I men's basketball season. The Eagles, led by 9th-year head coach Pat Kelsey, will play their home games at the Winthrop Coliseum in Rock Hill, South Carolina as members of the Big South Conference. They finished the season 23-2, 17-1 in Big South Play to finish as regular season champions. They defeated High Point, Longwood, and Campbell to be champions of the Big South tournament. They received the Big South’s automatic bid to the NCAA tournament where they lost in the first round to Villanova.

Previous season
The Eagles finished the 2019–20 season 24–10, 15–3 in Big South play to finish as Big South regular season co-champions, alongside Radford. Due to tiebreakers, they received the #2 seed in the Big South tournament. They defeated the #7 seed USC Upstate in the quarterfinals, 106–70. In the semifinals, they defeated the #3 seed Gardner–Webb, 78–66, to clinch their spot in the Big South tournament championship game. There, they matched up against the #5 seed Hampton, winning 76–68, earning the Big South's automatic bid into the NCAA tournament. However, the NCAA Tournament would be cancelled due to the COVID-19 pandemic.

Roster

Schedule and results 

|-
!colspan=12 style=| Regular season

|-
!colspan=12 style=| Big South tournament
|-

|-
!colspan=12 style=| NCAA tournament

Source

References

Winthrop Eagles men's basketball seasons
Winthrop Eagles
Winthrop Eagles men's basketball
Winthrop Eagles men's basketball
Winthrop